Callia apyra is a species of beetle in the family Cerambycidae. It was described by Martins and al. in 2010. It is known from Venezuela.

References

Calliini
Beetles described in 2010